Arthur Philip Fairfield (October 29, 1877 – December 14, 1946) was a vice admiral in the United States Navy.

Biography
Born in Saco, Maine, Fairfield served on the protected cruiser  during the Spanish–American War, before graduating from the United States Naval Academy in 1901.

In World War I, Commander Fairfield commissioned the destroyer  on 1 June 1918, and while commanding the destroyer  earned the award of the Navy Cross for his "prompt and efficient action in contact on September 8 with a submarine which attempted an attack upon a convoy".

Commander Fairfield taught at the United States Naval Academy following World War I, where he compiled a new Naval Academy textbook Naval Ordnance in 1920 for publication in 1921.

Captain Fairfield commanded the heavy cruiser  from 1930–1932, and in 1936 commanded Squadron 40-T, a special temporary squadron, organized to evacuate American nationals from the Spanish Civil War areas.

In 1938–39 Fairfield served as Assistant Chief of Naval Operations, and in 1939–1940, was commander of Battleship Division Three of the United States Fleet.

Fairfield was promoted to vice admiral when he retired on November 1, 1941. He was called back to active duty after the U.S. entered World War II the following month. He served as an advisor to the Maritime Commission, and was Chairman of the Board of Medals and Decorations, among other duties.

Fairfield retired again in 1945, and died on December 14, 1946. He and his wife Nancy Douglas Duval (1874–1947) are buried at Arlington National Cemetery in Virginia.

Namesake
The Liberty ship, launched in June 1944 as the William Hodson, which served as the Chung Tung under Lend-Lease to the Republic of China, was renamed Arthur P. Fairfield in 1947, then Admiral Arthur P. Fairfield in 1948, while being operated by the American Pacific Steamship Company.

References

External links

 
 Arthur P. Fairfield at ArlingtonCemetery.net, an unofficial website
 Arthur Philip Fairfield Letters, 1917–1932 (bulk 1925–1932) MS 363 held by Special Collection & Archives, Nimitz Library at the United States Naval Academy

1877 births
1946 deaths
Recipients of the Navy Cross (United States)
United States Navy vice admirals
United States Naval Academy alumni
Navy Midshipmen athletic directors
People from Saco, Maine
United States Navy personnel of World War I
United States Navy World War II admirals
Burials at Arlington National Cemetery
American military personnel of the Spanish–American War